Thyrou is a department or commune of Boulkiemdé Province in central Burkina Faso. As of 2005 it has a population of 24,487. Its capital lies at the town of Thyrou.

Towns and villages
ThyouBoutokoGoumogoKamséMoukouanSogpelcéSoulaTatyouVellaBangré

References

Departments of Burkina Faso
Boulkiemdé Province

fr:Thiou (département)